Wyoming Highway 316 (WYO 316) is an  east–west Wyoming state road in central Platte County.

Route description
Wyoming Highway 316 begins its western end in on the eastern side of Wheatland at I-25 Business/US 87 Business (9th Street). Highway 316 heads east, named Gilchrist Street, crosses railroad tracks and Rock Creek before passing along the south side of Phifer Airfield on Wheatland's eastern edge. WYO 316 leaves Wheatland at eight-tenths of a mile and passes through the community (CDP) of Chugcreek and changes names to Antelope Gap Road. Past Chugcreek, WYO 316 crosses Chugwater Creek as it continues east until reaching its end at a junction with Dickinson Hill and Deer Creek Roads east of Wheatland.

History
The designation of Highway 316 was originally signed in Converse and Campbell counties between 1926 and 1933 along present day Wyoming Highway 387 and Highway 59 between Midwest and Gillette. That designation lasted till about 1940 when it was renumbered to Wyoming Highway 116, no relation to present-day Highway 116.

Major intersections

References

External links 

Wyoming State Routes 300-399
WYO 316 - I-25 BUS/US 87 BUS to Antelope Gap Road

 
Transportation in Platte County, Wyoming
316